Wiluyu (Aymara wila blood, blood-red, uyu corral,  "red corral", Hispanicized spelling Veluyo) is a mountain in the Andes of southern Peru, about  high. It is located in the  Puno Region, Puno Province, Tiquillaca District. It lies between two rivers named Wanuni (Huanuni) and Uqi Jaqhi (Oqueaque), southwest of the mountain K'ara K'arani and southeast of Pura Purani.

References

Mountains of Puno Region
Mountains of Peru